Magic Mountain is a now defunct amusement park in Nobby Beach, Queensland, Australia which operated from 1962 to 1991. The amusement park was situated atop a mountain which now houses a variety of properties.

Origins
In 1962, Page Newman built the Nobby Beach chairlift that later formed part of the Magic Mountain entertainment park. A cafeteria was built on top of the outcrop. It was a gamble that paid off, in its first year of operation the chair-lift carried 40,000 people. A Magic Castle was built, giving the park the "magic" theme. Page Newman sold the park in 1976 to George Carrett. Carrett owned the park until 1982 when it was sold again. In 1983, the new owner commenced intensive development with A$13.6 million spent to extend the Magic Mountain theme park.

Attractions
 Castle
 Chairlift
 Chair O Planes
 Dodgem Cars
 Double-Decker Carousel
 Parachute Drop Tower (Giant Drop)
 Plane Ride
 Train
 Splashdown
 Ball Pit
 Jumping Castle
 Giant Cargo Nets
 Carousel
 Tram ride
 Magic Show in dedicated theatre
 Flickers (Old B&W silent movies)

Closure and demolition
Magic Mountain closed in mid 1987 and remained a derelict unused site until 1991 when the land was cleared and subdivided into two portions in 1995. The defunct site was briefly used as a set for a scene in the remake of the TV series Mission Impossible.

The land was sold and is now the site of restaurants, shops and predominantly, Magic Mountain Resort Apartments, named in its memory. The only remnants of the chairlift is a street sign, Chairlift Avenue. The chairlift was moved to Dreamworld, while the parachute tower was moved to Australia's Wonderland. Both attractions have since been closed.

External links
 Magic Mountain TV commercial 1986

See also
List of defunct amusement parks

References

Defunct amusement parks in Australia
1962 establishments in Australia
1991 disestablishments in Australia
Amusement parks in Queensland
Amusement parks opened in 1962
Amusement parks closed in 1991
Tourist attractions on the Gold Coast, Queensland